Phyllocephalum microcephalum is a species of Asian flowering plant in the sunflower family.

References

Vernonieae
Flora of Asia
Taxa named by Nicol Alexander Dalzell